The Bulletin of the American Meteorological Society is a scientific journal published by the American Meteorological Society. BAMS is the flagship magazine of AMS and publishes peer reviewed articles of interest and significance for the weather, water, and climate community as well as news, editorials, and reviews for AMS members. BAMS articles are fully open access; AMS members can also access the digital version which replicates the print issue cover-to-cover and often includes enhanced articles with audio and video.

See also 
 List of scientific journals
 List of scientific journals in earth and atmospheric sciences

External links 
 AMS publication site
 BAMS Digital Edition

Meteorology journals
Hybrid open access journals
Publications established in 1920
Monthly journals
English-language journals
American Meteorological Society academic journals